The men's 200 metre butterfly event at the 2014 Commonwealth Games as part of the swimming programme took place on 26 July at the Tollcross International Swimming Centre in Glasgow, Scotland.

The medals were presented by Kamalesh Sharma, Secretary-General of the Commonwealth of Nations and the quaichs were presented by James Hickman, 1998 Commonwealth champion and Global Sports Marketing Manager of Speedo.

Records
Prior to this competition, the existing world and Commonwealth Games records were as follows.

The following records were established during the competition:

Results

Heats

Final

References

External links

Men's 200 metre butterfly
Commonwealth Games